Frank Ryder (born 7 March 1909 – 1978) was an English former footballer who played as a winger for Prescot Cables, Bury, Torquay United, Rochdale, Ards, Altrincham, and Port Vale in the 1930s.

Career
Ryder played for Summerseat, Prescot Cables, Burnley (on trial), Bury, Torquay United, Rochdale, Ards, and Altrincham. He joined Port Vale in November 1935. He scored two goals in a 2–2 draw with Blackpool at The Old Recreation Ground on 14 December, and also bagged goals in heavy defeats to Tottenham Hotspur and Manchester United in February. He lost his first team place after seriously injuring his right shinbone at a 3–0 defeat to Bradford Park Avenue at the Horsfall Stadium on 21 March. He had played 17 Second Division games in the 1935–36 season, as the "Valiants" were relegated. He made six Third Division North appearances in the 1936–37 season, and left on a free transfer in April 1937.

Career statistics
Source:

References

1909 births
1978 deaths
Footballers from Bury, Greater Manchester
English footballers
Association football wingers
Prescot Cables F.C. players
Bury F.C. players
Torquay United F.C. players
Rochdale A.F.C. players
Ards F.C. players
Altrincham F.C. players
Port Vale F.C. players
English Football League players